The 1835 New Hampshire gubernatorial election was held on March 10, 1835.

Incumbent Democratic Governor William Badger defeated Whig nominee Joseph Healy with 63.00% of the vote.

General election

Candidates
William Badger, Democratic, incumbent Governor
Joseph Healy, Whig, innkeeper, former U.S. Representative. Healy was nominated in place of Andrew Pierce, who declined the Whig nomination.

Results

Notes

References

1835
New Hampshire
Gubernatorial